Parallel Worlds is the debut album by trumpeter Dave Douglas released on the Italian Soul Note label in 1993.  It features six of Douglas' compositions and compositions by Anton Webern, Kurt Weill, Duke Ellington and Igor Stravinsky performed by Douglas, Mark Feldman, Erik Friedlander, Mark Dresser and Michael Sarin.

Reception
The Allmusic review by Ron Wynn states "This isn't another hard bop outing or a completely free-wheeling session; instead, it's got elements of both, and a departure as well. It requires close scrutiny and a completely open mind, because Dave Douglas is following no direction except his own".

Track listing
All compositions by Dave Douglas except as indicated
 "Sehr Bewegt" (Webern) - 1:29
 "Parallel Worlds" - 9:16
 "In Progress" - 5:37
 "Remains" - 7:07
 "Piece for Strings" - 6:55
 "Ballad in Which Macheath Begs All Men for Forgiveness" (Weill) - 6:05
 "Loco Madi" (Ellington) - 5:53
 "On Your Leaving" - 7:15
 "For Every Action" - 9:30
 "Grand Choral" (Stravinsky) - 4:15
Recorded at Sear Sound, New York City on March 17 and 18, 1993

Personnel
Dave Douglas: trumpet
Mark Feldman: violin
Erik Friedlander: cello
Mark Dresser: bass
Michael Sarin: drums

References

1993 debut albums
Dave Douglas (trumpeter) albums
Black Saint/Soul Note albums